Fuhaid Sattam Al-Shammari (born 23 July 1982) is a Qatari footballer who is a winger. He is the brother of Saad Al-Shammari, the former captain of the Qatar national team.

Club career
Shammari started his football career at the age of 12 when he joined the junior team of Al Gharafa under the guidance of Hassan Afif (the father of Ali Afif), who was then the youth coach of Al Gharafa. He advanced rapidly through the ranks of Al Gharafa, until he reached the first team in 1999 at the age of 16, the youngest footballer in the Qatar Stars League at that time. Shammari helped Al Gharafa win the league three consecutive times from 2008 to 2010. In the 2008 season, he scored a goal against Al Sadd, who were then second in the league, in the 4th minute of extra time to draw the game 1-1 to ensure Al Gharafa stayed in first place.

Additionally, in the 2007-2008, he was the top scorer in the reserve league with 14 goals, and was the driving force behind Al Gharafa winning the reserve league. He scored 23 goals in the reserve league the next season.

Honours

Individual
Qatari Reserve League Top Scorer
 Winner (1): 2008

Personal
Shammari is married and has a son named Tamim.

References

External links

Player profile - QSL.com.qa

1982 births
Living people
Qatari footballers
Qatar international footballers
Association football wingers
Al-Gharafa SC players
Qatar Stars League players